Juho Julius Saaristo (21 July 1891 – 12 October 1969) was a Finnish track and field athlete. He won two medals at the 1912 Olympics: a silver in conventional javelin throw and a gold in the two-handed javelin throw, a one-time Olympic event in which the total was a sum of best throws with the right hand and with the left hand. He finished fourth in the javelin throw at the 1920 Olympics. Saaristo held the Finnish national title in the javelin in 1910, 1911 and 1919.

Biography
Saaristo was born to Kaarlo Saaristo (Lindholm) and  Wilhelmina Lindberg. He studied at the Tampere Industrial School in 1909–12, and from 1912 to 1915 studied machinery and electrical engineering at the Mitweida Technicum and at the Strelitz Technicum (now Technical School of Civil Engineering Neustrelitz) in Germany. In 1915 he enlisted to the German Army and was assigned to the 27th Jäger Battalion. He fought in World War I on the Eastern Front at the Misa River and the Gulf of Riga. On 25 February 1918 he returned to Finland and took part in the ongoing Finnish Civil War as a commanding officer. He then continued serving with the Finnish Army, fought in World War II, and was discharged from service after the war ended. He died of a throat cancer, though he was not a smoker himself.

In 1928 Saaristo married Olga Lydia Honkanen, they had two sons and an adopted daughter.

References

1891 births
1969 deaths
Sportspeople from Tampere
People from Häme Province (Grand Duchy of Finland)
German Army personnel of World War I
People of the Finnish Civil War (White side)
Finnish military personnel of World War II
Finnish male javelin throwers
Olympic athletes of Finland
Athletes (track and field) at the 1912 Summer Olympics
Athletes (track and field) at the 1920 Summer Olympics
Olympic gold medalists for Finland
Olympic silver medalists for Finland
Medalists at the 1912 Summer Olympics
Olympic gold medalists in athletics (track and field)
Olympic silver medalists in athletics (track and field)
Jägers of the Jäger Movement
Deaths from throat cancer
Deaths from cancer in Finland